Stephen R. Smith (August 28, 1836  December 1889) was born in Whitneyville, Connecticut, and was the twenty-fourth Adjutant General of the State of Connecticut. He was an active leader of the Republican Party; he served as an alderman and a councilman. He was also a Grand Marshal at the Grand Lodge of the State.

Military career
In February 1858, Stephen R. Smith joined the New Haven Grays. On January 13, 1876, he was promoted colonel of the 2nd Regiment. On January 8, 1885, Smith was appointed Connecticut Adjutant General by Governor Henry B. Harrison.

Personal life
Stephen R. Smith married Mary Cough on December 28, 1873.  They had four daughters and two sons; Lizzie M. (1874), Irenel (1876), Ethel (1878), Frank I (18811881), M. Pearl (1883), and Claire L. (1887).  Stephen R. Smith died in December 1889, in New Haven, Connecticut.

References

Military personnel from Connecticut
Connecticut Adjutant Generals
1836 births
1889 deaths